Suchánek (Czech feminine Suchánková) is a Slavic surname. Notable people with the surname include:

 Andreas Suchanek (born 1961), German economist
 Claus Suchanek (born 1979), German slalom canoeist
 Daniel Suchánek (born 1993), Czech canoeist
 Ingrida Suchánková (born 1993), Slovak karateka
 Jakub Suchánek (born 1984), Czech ice hockey player
 Jiři Suchánek (born 1982), Czech para table tennis player
 Les Suchanek, Australian soccer player
 Martin Suchánek (born 1958), Czech film director, photographer and screenwriter
 Michal Suchánek (born 1987), Canadian actor
 Michal Suchánek (Czech actor) (born 1965), Czech actor and comedian
 Rudolf Suchánek (born 1962), Czech ice hockey player
 Tomáš Suchánek (born 1984), Czech motorcycle speedway rider
 Věra Suchánková (1932–2004), Czech ice skater
 Vladimír Suchánek (born 1933), Czech artist

See also
 
 

Czech-language surnames